Leslie Strong (born 3 July 1953) is a former English association football player. He spent the majority of his career playing at left back for Fulham F.C., where he began as a youth player in 1969 under the guidance of World Cup winner George Cohen. Between 1972 and 1983, Strong made 427 appearances, including 373 League games, putting him 10th in the all time Fulham appearance list. After appearing in all 57 regular-season games, Strong missed the 1975 FA Cup Final against West Ham United due to injury.

In the 1981–82 season, manager Malcolm Macdonald made Strong the Fulham club captain and under his leadership,Fulham were promoted to the Second Division. In 1981, Strong was granted a testimonial season, for his 10 years service, culminating in a match versus England. After a brief loan to Brentford F.C. and a single season at Crystal Palace F.C,he ended his career with a single game for Rochdale A.F.C. Strong retired in 1985. He went on to manage the Anguilla national football team and Petite Rivière Noire FC of the Mauritian League. Under his management, they won the Mauritian Cup for the first time in 2007, thus qualifying for the African cup winners cup.

Strong is currently a popular match day host in Fulham's hospitality lounges.

References

1953 births
Association football defenders
English footballers
English Football League players
Footballers from Lambeth
Brentford F.C. players
Crystal Palace F.C. players
Fulham F.C. players
Living people
Rochdale A.F.C. players